Solidago speciosa, the showy goldenrod, is a North American species of flowering plants in the family Asteraceae. It grows in the province of Ontario in central Canada, as well as in the eastern and central United States (from the Atlantic coast west as far as the Great Plains, so from Maine to Georgia (except Delaware) west as far as Texas, Nebraska, and the Dakotas).

Solidago speciosa is a perennial herb up to 200 cm (80 inches, over 6 feet) tall, producing a thick underground caudex. One plant can produce as many as 5 stems, each with up to 300 small yellow flower heads.

Varieties
 Solidago speciosa var. rigidiuscula Torr. & A.Gray - mostly in western portions of range
 Solidago speciosa var. speciosa - mostly in eastern portions of range

References

speciosa
Flora of the United States
Flora of the Northeastern United States
Flora of the Southeastern United States
Flora of Eastern Canada
Plants described in 1818
Taxa named by Thomas Nuttall